Brimstone and Treacle is a 1976 BBC television play by Dennis Potter. Originally intended for broadcast as an episode of the series Play for Today, it remained untransmitted until 1987. The play was made into a film version (released in 1982) co-starring Sting. Both versions also star Denholm Elliott.

The play features a middle-aged middle-class couple living in a north London suburb whose life has been catastrophically affected by a hit-and-run accident which has left their beautiful undergraduate daughter totally dependent upon them. Their lives are dramatically changed by the arrival of a mysterious young stranger.

Plot
For two years, Tom and Amy Bates have been struggling to cope with their altered lives, after their daughter Pattie (or Patricia) was severely injured in a hit-and-run accident. Pattie is unable to walk, completely dependent upon others for the activities of daily living,  and seemingly unable to communicate beyond making unintelligible sounds. Although poorly educated and gullible, Amy firmly believes that Pattie is able to understand what is being said in her presence, whereas Tom has given up all hope of her recovery. In fact, judging from the sounds she makes, Pattie seems to realise what is going on around her, but Tom is beyond noticing.

One day on his way home from work he witnesses a handsome, well-dressed young man collapse in the street. Tom is among the passersby who offer to help him. The young man, who gives his name as Martin Taylor, quickly recovers. A few hours later he turns up at the Bates', handing Tom his wallet, which Martin pretends Tom lost in the general hubbub. Though the cash is gone, Tom's credit card is still there.

From the moment he enters the house, he casts furtive and knowing glances at the audience (according to the stage directions) so they know at once that he is not what he pretends to be. He claims to have been Pattie's fiancé.

He offers to be at Pattie's side despite the changed circumstances, and care for her for an unspecified period. Amy in particular jumps at the suggestion; she has not had an hour off since Pattie's accident and is stranded in the house without the chance to go even to the hairdressers or do some window-shopping.

Tom is reluctant to accept Martin's help. He has always been very choosy about his daughter's friends, and as he cannot remember Pattie ever mentioning Martin's name, he does not want her to be left alone with what might well be a complete stranger. Eventually Martin wins him over by his excellent cooking and lip service to his politics; Tom has joined the National Front.

At the first opportunity, Martin rapes the helpless Pattie (although in the film version, the rape comes late in the action, precipitating Pattie's return to consciousness shortly after he removes her nappy). When Amy comes back from the hairdressers she recognises a change in her daughter's facial expression, but attributes it to Martin's presence. However, when Martin tries to rape the disabled girl again after Tom and Amy have gone to bed, Pattie starts screaming so loudly that he runs out of the house. When they come to see what has happened to their daughter, they find that she has fully recovered from her disabilities, and though still confused, asks her father what has been happening to her. She also recovers her memories of the events preceding her accident, which result from her discovery of her father's infidelity.

Television version 

Brimstone and Treacle was originally written by Potter as a television play, commissioned, paid for and recorded in 1976 by the BBC, for their series Play for Today. The cast were Denholm Elliott (Tom Bates), Michael Kitchen (Martin), Patricia Lawrence (Amy Bates) and Michelle Newell (Pattie); plus minor characters.

The original 1976 play was withdrawn shortly before its scheduled transmission (despite being listed in the Radio Times) because then Director of Television Programmes Alasdair Milne found it "nauseating" though "brilliantly made". It was finally shown in August 1987 and has been released as a DVD. Rewritten by Potter for the stage, the play premiered on 11 October 1977 at the Crucible Theatre, Sheffield and transferred to the West End the following year.

In the introduction to the play script, published in 1978, Potter recalled that "the BBC received several letters of congratulation for 'taking a stand' against the rising tide etc. of filth etc. and blasphemy etc. which ever threatens etc. to swamp our already beleaguered land". Justifying the play, he wrote: "Brimstone and Treacle is an attempt both to parody certain familiar forms of faith and yet at the same time to give them expression. … we cannot even begin to define 'good' and 'evil' without being aware of the interaction between the two. It is from these things the play draws whatever power or whatever disturbance that earned it an unwelcome notoriety."

Film adaptation

A film adaptation was released in 1982. Directed by Richard Loncraine, it stars Denholm Elliott as Bates, Joan Plowright as Norma Bates, Suzanna Hamilton as Pattie and Sting as Martin. In the film, Mrs. Bates's first name is Norma instead of Amy.

The soundtrack includes works by The Police, Sting, The Go-Go's and Squeeze, while Sting's cover of "Spread a Little Happiness" reached No. 16 in the UK Singles Chart.

Brimstone & Treacle was released to DVD by MGM Home Video in 2003 as a Region 1 widescreen DVD.

Potter on Brimstone and Treacle

In 1978, Potter said:I had written Brimstone and Treacle in difficult personal circumstances. Years of acute psoriatic arthropathy — unpleasantly affecting skin and joints — had not only taken their toll in physical damage but had also, and perhaps inevitably, mediated my view of the world and the people in it. I recall writing (and the words now make me shudder) that the only meaningful sacrament left to human beings was for them to gather in the streets in order to be sick together, splashing vomit on the paving stones as the final and most eloquent plea to an apparently deaf, dumb and blind God. [...] I was engaged in an extremely severe struggle not so much against the dull grind of a painful and debilitating illness but with unresolved, almost unacknowledged, 'spiritual' questions.

See also
Brimstone and Treacle (soundtrack)

References

External links
 (1987 TV)
 (1982 film)
British Film Institute Screen Online
TV Cream review

1976 television plays
1982 films
1982 drama films
BBC television dramas
Films directed by Richard Loncraine
Play for Today
Disability in fiction
Rape in fiction
Television shows written by Dennis Potter
1980s English-language films